The Post Office Railway is a  narrow gauge, driverless underground railway in London that was built by the Post Office with assistance from the Underground Electric Railways Company of London, to transport mail between sorting offices. Inspired by the Chicago Tunnel Company, it opened in 1927 and operated for 76 years until it closed in 2003. A museum within the former railway was opened in September 2017.

Geography 
It had eight stations, the largest of which was underneath Mount Pleasant, but by 2003 only three stations remained in use because the sorting offices above the other stations had been relocated.

History

Use as post office railway

The contract to build the tunnels was won by John Mowlem and Co. Construction of the tunnels started in February 1915 from a series of shafts. Most of the line was constructed using the Greathead shield system, with limited amounts of hand-mining for connecting tunnels at stations.

The main line has a single  diameter tube with two tracks. Just before stations, tunnels diverge into two single-track  diameter tunnels leading to two parallel  diameter station tunnels. Stations are at a much shallower depth, with a 1-in-20 gradient into the stations. The gradients assist in slowing the trains when approaching stations, and accelerating them away. There is also less distance to lift mail from the stations to the surface. At Oxford Circus the tunnel runs close to the Bakerloo line tunnel of the London Underground.

During 1917, work was suspended due to the shortage of labour and materials. By June 1924, track laying had started. In February 1927, the first section, between Paddington and the West Central District Office, was made available for training. The line became available for the Christmas parcel post in 1927 and letters were carried from February 1928.

In 1954, plans were developed for a new Western District Office at Rathbone Place, which required a diversion, opening in 1958. It was not until 3 August 1965 that the new station and office were opened by the Postmaster General, Tony Benn. The disused section was used as a store tunnel; some parts of it still have the track in place.

Closure
A Royal Mail press release in April 2003 said that the railway would be closed and mothballed at the end of May that year. Royal Mail had earlier stated that using the railway was five times more expensive than using road transport for the same task. The Communication Workers Union claimed the actual figure was closer to three times more expensive but argued that this was the result of a deliberate policy of running the railway down and using it at only one-third of its capacity. A local governmental report by the Greater London Authority stated that the "line carries an average of four million letters and parcels per day" and was in support of continued use and criticized the increase of lorries on local roads, estimated to be 80 more truck loads per week. The railway was closed on 31 May 2003.

In April 2011, an urban exploration group called the "Consolidation Crew" published accounts of illicit access to the tunnels. Detailed photography and text revealed that the railway is still largely in good condition, despite some natural decay. More recently, media have been admitted to the tunnels as part of the pre-launch publicity for the Postal Museum. Photographs show much of the infrastructure in place.

A team from the University of Cambridge has taken over a short, double track section of unused Post Office tunnel near Liverpool Street Station, where a newly built tunnel for Crossrail is situated some two metres beneath. The study is to establish how the original cast-iron lining sections, which are similar to those used for many miles of railway under London, resist possible deformation and soil movement caused by the new works. Digital cameras, fibre optic deformation sensors, laser scanners and other low-cost instruments, reporting in real time, have been installed in the vacated tunnel. As well as providing information about the behaviour of the old construction materials, the scheme can also provide an early warning if the new tunnel bores are creating dangerous soil movement.

Redevelopment and preservation

In October 2013, the British Postal Museum & Archive announced that it intended opening part of the network to the public. After approval was granted by Islington Council, work on the new museum and the railway began in 2014. Special tourist trains were installed in late 2016. It was planned to open a circular route, running beneath the depot at Mount Pleasant with a journey time of around 15 minutes, by mid-2017. The museum opened on 5 September.

In its first year of operation (2017–2018), the trains performed 9,000 trips totalling , with the railway and museum hosting over 198,000 visitors.

Rolling stock
The first stock was delivered in 1926 with the opening of the system. All stock used was electrically powered.

Electric locomotives
1926 Electric Locomotives — Original locomotives

Electric units
1927 Stock — Original stock
1930 & 1936 Stock — Replacement stock for 1927 Stock
1962 Stock — Prototype stock
1980 Stock — Replacement stock

Some trains have been preserved at the Launceston Steam Railway.

In fiction
The railway features in the novel The Horn of Mortal Danger by Lawrence Leonard in which there is a connecting tunnel to a secret railway to the North London network. The only other known connection is in the disused tunnel between Highgate and the disused Cranley Gardens.
A version of the railway is featured in the novel 'The Great Game' by Lavie Tidhar. It takes mail to Buckingham Palace, and is run by the book's featured Simulacra.
The railway appears in the film Hudson Hawk as 'Poste Vaticane' in the Vatican City. Bruce Willis (as Hawk) stows away in one of the mail containers.
A mail train system closely based on the railway is in Charlie Higson's third Young Bond book, Double or Die.
The railway is prominent in Oliver Harris's 2014 book Deep Shelter.
The railway features in Mark Leggatt's 2016 novel The London Cage, as a means for Connor Montrose to move about London.  The International Thriller, a follow up to Names of the Dead, was published by Scottish-based publisher Fledgling Press in June 2016.
The railways make an appearance in Adrian Tchaikovsky’s 2020 novel The Doors of Eden as Khan and Lee are being led by Stig towards a door to escape from pursuit by Rove’s henchmen.

Similar railways
A pneumatic underground railway was used by the Post Office in London between 1863 and 1874 using individual wheeled capsules, operated by the London Pneumatic Despatch Company.

In 1910, a  tunnel railway opened in Munich, Germany between München Hauptbahnhof and the nearby Post office. The tunnels were damaged in World War II, restored in 1948 and partially rebuilt in 1966 to allow for the first Munich S-Bahn tunnel. Operations ceased in 1988.

Postal Telegraph and Telephone (Switzerland) (de) opened the  Post-U-Bahn (underground railway) in Zürich in 1938. It ran between Zürich Hauptbahnhof and the Sihlpost (de), Zürich's main post office. The track gauge was 60 cm, and the small electric railcar, which could carry 250 kg of mail, collected power from wires between the tracks. Operations ceased on 11 October 1980 when a rubber-tired system replaced the train.

The Chicago Tunnel Company, in operation between 1906 and 1959, delivered freight, parcels, and coal, and disposed of ash and excavation debris. It operated an elaborate network of  narrow gauge track in  tunnels running under the streets throughout the central business district including and surrounding the "Loop".

See also 
Subterranean London
List of British heritage and private railways
Munich Post-U-Bahn (de)
Travelling Post Office
Zürich Post-U-Bahn (de)
London Underground
Royal Mail

References

Notes

Literature 

 
 
 Bradley Garrett (2013). "Explore Everything: Place-Hacking the City." Verso Books, London.

Further reading

External links 

The British Postal Museum & Archive
Place Hacking A collective report of the trespass into the network by urban explorers in 2011.
Guardian article on proposed mothballing.
BBC article A video from the mothballed railway, detailing plans for future use.
Mail rail in openstreetmap.org

 
Electric railways in the United Kingdom
Industrial railways in England
2 ft gauge railways in England
Subterranean London
History of rail transport in London
Postal history of the United Kingdom
Railway lines opened in 1927
Railway lines closed in 2003
Postal infrastructure in the United Kingdom
Tunnels completed in 1927
Tunnels in London
1927 establishments in England
2003 disestablishments in England